Santiago Astata is a town and municipality in Oaxaca in south-western Mexico.
It is part of the Tehuantepec District in the west of the Istmo Region.
The name "Astata" means "place of herons".

The municipality covers an area of 446.54 km² at an elevation of 30 metres above sea level.
The climate is very warm.
Flora includes deciduous trees and shrubs such as passion fruit, cachimbo and mesquite.
Wild fauna consist of deer, rabbit, badger and wild boar.

As of 2005, the municipality had a total population of 3,642 of whom 273 spoke an indigenous language.
A few people speak the lowland version of Oaxacan Chontal, a language that is in danger of extinction.
Economic activities include agriculture (beans, corn, sesame, sorghum, watermelon, cantaloupe, tomatoes and peanuts), animal husbandry (cattle, goats and pigs), harvesting the ocean for fish and shellfish for the Salina Cruz market, limestone quarrying and logging.

References

Municipalities of Oaxaca